Brooke "Medicine Eagle" Edwards (born 1943) is an American author, singer/songwriter and teacher, specializing in her interpretations of Native American religions. She frequently teaches workshops at New Age and other events.

Biography
Edwards was born and raised in Montana. She studied at the University of Denver obtaining a BA degree in psychology and mathematics. She earned an MA in counseling psychology from the University of Denver. She has self-identified as having some "Sioux and Nez Perce ancestry," as well as European blood from Scotland, Ireland, and Denmark. She is not enrolled in any of these tribes, however, and her statements and misrepresentations of Native American spirituality have been contested and protested by several Native American groups, including the American Indian Movement.

In 1984, the American Indian Movement included Edwards among those it said were responsible for "a great attack or theft" of Native American ceremonies, and in a 2001 article in the Journal of Religious & Theological Information, Cynthia Snavely connected Edwards to the "misappropriation of Native American spirituality [that] takes place within the New Age spirituality movement". The Center for the SPIRIT (Support and Protection of Indian Religions and Indigenous Traditions) accused her of misrepresenting her heritage and falsely claiming to be a medicine woman.

Bianca Casady of the musical group CocoRosie has referred to Brooke Medicine Eagle as her mother's partner, stating "As a small child I was carried in a papoose around sacred Anasazi grounds by my mother and her partner, Brook[e] Medicine Eagle."

See also
Plastic shaman

Works

Audio

Books

References

External links 
 

1943 births
American women writers
American people who self-identify as being of Native American descent
Impostors
Living people
New Age spiritual leaders
San Francisco State University faculty
University of Denver alumni
Writers from Montana
21st-century American women